in Motla Khurd is a village in Jatusana Tehsil, Rewari district, Haryana, Good place to visit. Its postal head office is Dahina.

References 

Villages in Rewari district